John Michael Carroll (April 27, 1823 – May 8, 1901) was an American educator, lawyer, and politician who served one term as a member of the United States House of Representatives from New York from 1871 to 1873.

Life and career
John M. Carroll was born in Springfield, New York on April 27, 1823.  He attended Fairfield Seminary and graduated from Union College with a degree in civil engineering in 1846, where he was a member of the Kappa Alpha Society and was elected to Phi Beta Kappa.  After college he taught school while studying law and attained admission to the bar in 1848.  He practiced in Fonda and Broadalbin, and relocated to Johnstown in 1862.

Political career 
A Democrat, he served as Fulton County District Attorney from 1859 to 1862.

Tenure in Congress 
In 1870 he was elected to Congress and served one term, (March 4, 1871 - March 3, 1873).  He was not a candidate for reelection in 1872 and returned to his law practice.

Death and burial
Carroll died in Johnstown on May 8, 1901 and was buried in Johnstown Cemetery.

References

External resources

John M. Carroll at Find A Grave

1823 births
1901 deaths
People from Springfield, New York
People from Johnstown, New York
New York (state) lawyers
American civil engineers
Union College (New York) alumni
Democratic Party members of the United States House of Representatives from New York (state)
19th-century American politicians
Engineers from New York (state)